Carl Edvard Bacher (16 October 1875 – 22 March 1961) was a Finnish sport shooter who competed in the 1912 Summer Olympics.

He was born and died in Helsinki. In 1912 he was part of the Finnish team which finished fifth in the team clay pigeons event. In the individual trap competition he finished 45th.

References

1875 births
1961 deaths
Sportspeople from Helsinki
People from Uusimaa Province (Grand Duchy of Finland)
Finnish male sport shooters
Trap and double trap shooters
Olympic shooters of Finland
Shooters at the 1912 Summer Olympics